Pseudatemelia xanthosoma is a moth of the family Oecophoridae. It was described by Rebel in 1900. It is found in Spain and Portugal.

The wingspan is 20–21 mm.

References

Moths described in 1900
Amphisbatinae